Víctor Raul Díaz Chávez served as the Peruvian Minister of Education under President Alan García from 19 March 2011 to 28 July 2011.

References

Living people
Government ministers of Peru
Year of birth missing (living people)